Loved You First may refer to:

 "Loved You First", a 2016 song by O'G3NE from We Got This
 "Loved You First", a 2012 song by One Direction from Take Me Home